SM UC-79 was a German Type UC II minelaying submarine or U-boat in the German Imperial Navy during World War I.

Design
A German Type UC II submarine, UC-79 had a displacement of  when at the surface and  while submerged. The submarine was powered by two six-cylinder four-stroke diesel engines each producing  (a total of ), two electric motors producing , and two propeller shafts.

UC-79 was fitted with six  mine tubes, eighteen UC 200 mines, three  torpedo tubes (one on the stern and two on the bow), seven torpedoes, and one  Uk L/30 deck gun. Her complement was twenty-six crew members.

History
UC-79 was ordered on 12 January 1916 and was launched on 19 December 1916. She was commissioned into the Imperial German Navy on 22 January 1917 as SM UC-79. In eleven patrols UC-79 was credited with sinking 10 ships, either by torpedo or by mines laid. On 28 April 1917, she captured the Danish coaster  in the Skagerrak. UC-79 was sunk by a mine off Cap Gris Nez, France in late March or early April 1918. Royal Navy divers located the wreck in that area in August 1918.

Summary of raiding history

References

Notes

Citations

Bibliography

 
 

Ships built in Hamburg
German Type UC II submarines
U-boats commissioned in 1917
U-boats sunk by mines
U-boats sunk in 1918
World War I minelayers of Germany
World War I shipwrecks in the English Channel
World War I submarines of Germany
1916 ships
Ships lost with all hands
Maritime incidents in 1918